William Howard was an American woodworker and craftsman who lived in Mississippi during the mid-nineteenth century. Howard is known for his relief carvings that depict common tools and objects from daily life including cutlery, scissors, hammers, and pitchers. Once enslaved by William McWillie, the governor of Mississippi, Howard continued to work at the Kirkwood Plantation following the Civil War.

Collections 
 Minneapolis Institute of Art
 Ricco/Maresca
 Wadsworth Atheneum

References

External links 
 Writing Desk, c. 1870
 "A Freed Slaves Designs" New York Times

African-American artists
American artists
Artists from Mississippi